Sheykh Ali Kola (also Romanized as Sheykh ‘Alī Kolā) is a village in Natel-e Restaq Rural District, Chamestan District, Nur County, Mazandaran Province, Iran. At the 2006 census, its population was 167, in 35 families.

References 

Populated places in Nur County